The 1988 Nordic Figure Skating Championships were held from March 4th through 6th, 1988 at the Askerhallen in Asker, Norway. The competition was open to elite figure skaters from Nordic countries. Skaters competed in three disciplines, men's singles, ladies' singles, and ice dancing across two levels: senior (Olympic-level) and junior.

Senior results

Men

Ladies

Junior results

Men

Ladies

Ice dancing

References

Nordic Figure Skating Championships, 1988
Nordic Figure Skating Championships, 1988
Nordic Figure Skating Championships
International figure skating competitions hosted by Norway
Sport in Asker
Winter sports competitions in Norway